Hal Sherman (born Harold Sicherman; March 31, 1911 – January 25, 2009) was a gag cartoonist and a Platinum Age and Golden Age comic book artist. He is best remembered for his work on the Star-Spangled Kid, which he co-created with Jerry Siegel, who had previously co-created Superman.

Gag cartooning
Sherman drew gag cartoons for magazines, including College Laughs. During the 1950s, he created cartoons for cocktail napkins published by Monogram of California. His napkin sets include Double Feature, which was two-panel cartoons, one on the outside of the napkin, one that appeared when it was unfolded (1955); Little Friar, gags about a friar (1956);  and Nudeniks, cartoons about nudists (1958).

During the 1960s, he expanded the Little Friar and the Nudeniks material each into their own full paperback of cartoons. He also drew Alley Whoops! (1962), a book of bowling cartoons, Pennant Laffs (1963), a book of punch-out humorous pennants, and Fishing for Laughs (1964), a volume of fishing cartoons.

Awards
 Inkpot Award, 2002

Personal life
Sherman and Ann, his wife of over 60 years, are buried together in Mount Hebron Cemetery in Flushing, New York.

References

1911 births
2009 deaths
American cartoonists
Golden Age comics creators
Inkpot Award winners
Jewish American artists